Philedonides rhombicana is a species of moth of the family Tortricidae. It is found in Germany, Austria, Italy, the Czech Republic, Slovakia, Hungary, Romania and Ukraine.

The wingspan is 13–16 mm. The forewings have a light chocolate brown or yellow to chocolate brown tone, with a dark chocolate brown stripe and subapical spot. Adults are on wing from June to August.

The larvae feed on Mentha, Trifolium, Rumex (including Rumex acetosella), Genista and Rosa species.

References

External links
Lepiforum.de

Moths described in 1851
Moths of Europe
Archipini
Taxa named by Gottlieb August Wilhelm Herrich-Schäffer